Leon Soma (born 25 February 1982) is a Zimbabwean cricketer. He played twenty-three first-class matches between 1999 and 2004.

See also
 CFX Academy cricket team

References

External links
 

1982 births
Living people
Zimbabwean cricketers
CFX Academy cricketers
Manicaland cricketers
Cricketers from Mutare